Mumsdollar was a New Zealand rock band formed in 1998 with Ben Claxton on lead vocals, Dave Barr on guitar and backing vocals, Tim Beale on drums, and brothers Pete Wood, on guitar, and Steve Wood on bass and backing vocals.

History
Mumsdollar was formed when Ben Claxton on lead vocals, Dave Barr on guitar and backing vocals, Tim Beale on drums, and brothers Pete Wood, on guitars, and Steve Wood on bass and backing vocals got together to enter YFC Capital Teen Convention (CTC) band competition. Their name was chosen when Ben was at Hillsong Conference and at offering time only had 1 dollar, his mum's dollar. They originally intended to change the name after CTC but it just stuck.

Since then Mumsdollar has become one of the biggest bands in the kiwi music scene. They have also released their album A Beautiful Life in Japan. Mumsdollar were also one of the favourites at the New Zealand Christian music festival Parachute.

In 2009 their Album "Ruins" won a  Vodafone New Zealand Music Award for "Best Gospel/Christian Album"  beating Parachute Band, The Ember Days and Primalband. It also Charted at #15 on the New Zealand Album charts in late January 2009.

Break Up
In 2009 Mumsdollar announced that they would be breaking up at the end of the year due to lead singer Ben Claxton going on his OE. They performed a final tour around New Zealand in early December. Ben Claxton was working in England as a Physical education Teacher at a secondary school, but is now back at James Cook High School in Manurewa, South Auckland teaching as a Physical Education and Health teacher, where he was working before he went on his OE.

Reunion
It was announced on 12 September 2012 that Mumsdollar would be reuniting to play one show at Parachute Music Festival in 2013.

Related Projects
Ben and Dave from Mumsdollar also make up an acoustic band called Shooting Stars.

Members

Current members
Ben Claxton – lead vocals (1998–2009)
Dave Barr – guitar, backing vocals (1998–2009)
Steve Wood – bass guitar, backing vocals (1998–2009)
Pete Wood – guitar (1998–2009)
Tim Beale – drums (1998–2009)

Former members
Duncan – horns (2001)

Discography
Buy This Album So We Can Make A Good One (demo) (2000)
For Christ's Sake (2001)
Eastern Time (2002)
Eastern Time (re-release) (2004)
A Beautiful Life EP (2005)
A Beautiful Life (2005)
Ruins (2008)

References

Sources 
 http://www.mumsdollar.com/bio.htm
 http://www.muzic.net.nz/artists/574.html
 http://www.amplifier.co.nz/artist/20320/mumsdollar.html?full=1
 http://www.soulpurpose.co.nz/music/bands-artists/mumsdollar-goodness/
 https://web.archive.org/web/20091012094406/http://www.nzmusicawards.co.nz/2009/08/13/209/

New Zealand alternative rock groups